In Greek mythology, Nomos (Ancient Greek: Νομος) was the daemon of laws, statutes, and ordinances. By one account, Nomos' wife is Eusebia (Piety), and their daughter is Dike (Justice).

Mythology 
Nomos was described as the ruler of gods and men:The holy king of Gods and men I call, celestial Law [Nomos], the righteous seal of all;The seal which stamps whate'er the earth contains, Nature's firm basis, and the liquid plains:Stable, and starry, of harmonious frame, preserving laws eternally the same:Thy all-composing pow'r in heaven appears, connects its frame, and props the starry spheres;And shakes weak Envy with tremendous sound, toss'd by thy arm in giddy whirls around.'Tis thine, the life of mortals to defend, and crown existence with a blessed end;For thy command and alone, of all that lives order and rule to ev'ry dwelling gives:Ever observant of the upright mind, and of just actions the companion kind;Foe to the lawless, with avenging ire, their steps involving in destruction dire.Come, bless, abundant pow'r, whom all revere, by all desir'd, with favr'ing mind draw near;Give me thro' life, on thee to fix my fight, and ne'er forsake the equal paths of right.

Notes

References 

 The Hymns of Orpheus. Translated by Taylor, Thomas (1792). University of Pennsylvania Press, 1999. Online version at the theoi.com

Greek gods
Personifications in Greek mythology
Daimons
Justice gods